Bikini Moon is a New York indie film about perception of reality. Directed by Milcho Manchevski, it details the story of a troubled homeless vet.  The faux-documentary stars Condola Rashad, Sarah Goldberg, Will Janowitz, and newcomer Sathya Sridharan.

Premise 
A charismatic but mentally unstable vet captures the attention of a documentary film crew who are ready to exploit her story for their own shot at independent movie fame.

Cast 
 Condola Rashad as Bikini
 Sarah Goldberg as Kate
 Will Janowitz as Trevor
 Sathya Sridharan as Krishna
 Jeannine Kaspar as Leila
 Alexis Suarez as Deli Clerk
 Alex Kruz as Arresting Policeman
 Mykal-Michelle Harris as Ashley
 Cliff Moylan as Marc
 Eugene Prokofiev as Igor
 Irungu Mutu as Mr. Wheatley
 Alyssa Cheatham as Alvina Wheatley
 Gemma Forbes as Ines
 Gregory Dann as Policeman
 Vladimir Bibic as Mr. Ilic
 Brian Sills as Bruno
 Henny Russell as City Clerk

Production 
Bikini Moon went into initial production in April 2016 in New York City, and wrapped filming in June 2016.

Release 
The film's premiere was at the 41st Mostra Internacional de Cinema São Paulo, Brazil.
Its New York premiere was in October 2018.

Awards 
Tallgrass Film Festival - for Outstanding Female Actor

References

External links
 
Cineeuropa review
Bikini Moon Trailer
Press quotes
The Hollywood Reporter, Deborah Young

American docudrama films
2017 films
Films shot in New York City
American drama films
2017 drama films
2010s English-language films